Carlo Polucci or Palucci (1650 - January 18, 1743) was an Italian painter, active in a Baroque style.

Biography
He was born to an aristocratic family in Ascoli Piceno, but desired to become a painter and that led him to training under Ludovico Trasi, and after the former's passing, to work with Giuseppe Giosafatti. He is better known for his pupils in Ascoli, than for his works. He is buried in Sant'Agostino in Ascoli.

References

1650 births
1743 deaths
People from the Province of Ascoli Piceno
17th-century Italian painters
Italian male painters
18th-century Italian painters
Italian Baroque painters
18th-century Italian male artists